ろ, in hiragana, or ロ in katakana, (romanised as ro) is one of the Japanese kana, each of which represents one mora. The hiragana is written in one stroke, katakana in three. Both represent  and both originate from the Chinese character 呂. The Ainu language uses a small ㇿ to represent a final r sound after an o sound (オㇿ or). The combination of an R-column kana letter with handakuten ゜- ろ゚ in hiragana, and ロ゚ in katakana was introduced to represent [lo] in the early 20th century.

Stroke order

Other communicative representations

 Full Braille representation

 Computer encodings

See also

Japanese phonology

References

Specific kana